Aars water tower is a water tower located in Aars in Himmerland, Denmark. The tower is built right in the middle of a very old water tank from where the city's original water supply went out. As it sounds, it was Aars's water tower. The building has many beautiful handicrafts. In the past the tower used to have a neon logo on top and the logo on top was the Cimbrian bull from Aars and Aars Municipality coat of arm/shild, but it was taken down. The tower was also a shop where you could buy yarn and many other things like tea cups. But the shop moved away from the tower.

References

Water towers in Denmark
Buildings and structures in Vesthimmerland Municipality